Broken Glass is the fourth studio album by American sludge metal band Crowbar, released on October 29, 1996.

Track listing

Music videos
"Like Broken Glass"

Credits
Crowbar
Kirk Windstein – vocals, rhythm guitar
Matt Thomas – lead guitar
Todd Strange – bass
Jimmy Bower – drums

Additional personnel
Phil Anselmo – additional vocals

References

1996 albums
Crowbar (American band) albums